Dearborn Hills is a golf course built in 1922-23 by the late Robert Herndon, a prominent local developer and benefactor.  It is reputed to be Michigan's oldest public golf course and is listed in the State Register of Historic Sites.  In the summer of 1991 it closed to undergo a nearly $5 million renovation and expansion.  The resulting new course was named "Michigan's Best Public Golf Course" by Detroit News readers and awarded 3½ stars by Golf Digest's "Best Places To Play".

Gallery

Dearborn, Michigan
Golf clubs and courses in Michigan
Sports venues in Wayne County, Michigan
Event venues established in 1923